Nowhere To Be Found (often abbreviated as NTBF) are an alternative metal band formed in Ericeira in 2018. The group consists of vocalist Tiago Duarte, bassist Manel Gomes, drummer Miguel Rodrigues and lead guitarist João Quintais. The style of their early work has been described as nu-metal or post-grunge but they have since evolved to a heavier sound, often described as alternative metal, alternative rock or even post-hardcore.

The band produced its songs with Swedish producer Henrik Udd (the mastermind behind game changing albums for bands such as Bring Me The Horizon and Architects), the "2017 Producer of the Year" at the Heavy Music Awards, and also engineer Ted Jensen, known for having a Grammy Award for Best Engineered Album and for having mastered 16 Grammy Award winner albums in other categories (Metallica, Green Day, Muse, Deftones, Paul McCartney, Madonna and Coldplay among them).

NTBF have released four singles and a Live EP and in late 2019 they aired on North American CBS’s Sound Of The Underground tv show as one of the world’s most exciting upcoming bands. The band's latest singles, 'The Prey' and 'Blinding Lights', premiered on MTV.

History 
Manel, Miguel (better known as 'Migalhas') and Tiago are childhood friends, having all been born and raised in Torres Vedras, a small city not far from Ericeira, at the time known for having a cool and exciting rock and punk vibes. Having had several bands together throughout the years (Metta Bhavana, Project Drizza, Daydream, insch), they met Quintais in 2018 and - feeling an immediate creative chemistry - they decided to form Nowhere To Be Found.

They would go on to record with Swedish producer Henrik Udd, "2017 Producer of the Year" award winner at the Heavy Music Awards, who worked with bands such as Bring Me the Horizon and Architects, and would master new songs in New York with Grammy Award winner Ted Jensen – the sound engineer known as the recurring choice of industry giants such as Metallica, Green Day, Muse, Deftones, Slipknot, Paul McCartney, Madonna and Coldplay.

Confirming the new songs’ potentials, there were collaborations with the likes of Memphis May Fire’s front man Matty Mullins in the song "Traverse" and Emily Lazar from September Mourning in the song "Closer".

The band owns and directly manages all its music, alongside Nuno Luz, founder and managing director at TwoFour Music.

Artistry

Musical style and influences 

Nowhere To Be Found have always claimed influences from numerous genres, with musical references diversifying immensely within the band members. Their sound has been described as alternative metal, melodic metalcore or post-hardcore. Mainstream music critics Happy People Music wrote "Have you been wondering what’s been happening on the alternative metal scene these days? To be honest I think there’s a lack of new bands in this genre. ‘Nowhere To Be Found’ are about to change that [...]" and Bloggers Gamut added "For some bands, coming to terms with the fact you need to change your whole identity can be a make or break situation. A name change, lineup change and sound change can be too much to tackle for most, but for Nowhere to Be Found, it seems to be the beginning of something beautiful."

Vocals and lyrics 

NTBF's lyrics are mostly personal and biographical, having been described by the band as inspired in specific events in the band's life and growth experiences, although not intended to be depictive but rather emotionally suggestive.

Songwriting and recording process 
All of Nowhere To Be Found's lyrics are written by lead vocalist Tiago Duarte while all four members are credited with writing the music. The band owns its own studio in Ericeira, where they rehearse, do live streams, record demos and songs. The live EP ‘Live From Nowhere’ was entirely recorded in the band’s studio.

Gear 

NTBF are endorsed and part of several artist's programs for a variety of brands, such as Paul Reed Smith guitars, Ernie Ball strings and accessories, Zildjian cymbals, Remo drumheads, Orange amplifiers and sE Electronics microphones.

Being effects pedals enthusiasts, Tiago, Manel and Quintais all use analog pedalboards with a vary of effects from Boss, Morley, Electro Harmonix, Ibanez, Artec, Dunlop, MXR, DigiTech, TC_Helicon and Voodoo Lab. Miguel plays on a Taye drum set, with Remo drumheads and Zildjian A-Custom cymbals. He also uses Zildjian drums sticks, mostly 5A. Tiago, Manel and João use sE V7 MK – Miles Kennedy signature edition microphones, and all three play with Ernie Ball Everlast picks.

Band members

Members 
 Tiago Duarte – lead vocals and rhythm guitar (2018–present)
 Manel Gomes – bass and backing vocals (2018–present)
 'Migalhas' Rodrigues – drums, percussion (2018–present)
 João Quintais – lead guitar (2018–present)

Timeline

Discography

Singles 

 Closer [official music video]
 Traverse feat. Matty Mullins [official music video]
 The Prey [official music video]
 Blinding Lights [official music video]
 Hell Must Be Empty [official music video]

Albums 

 Live From Nowhere

References

External link

2014 establishments in Portugal
Musical groups established in 2014